Dornburg-Camburg is a Verwaltungsgemeinschaft ("collective municipality") in the district Saale-Holzland, in Thuringia, Germany. The seat of the Verwaltungsgemeinschaft is in Dornburg-Camburg.

The Verwaltungsgemeinschaft Dornburg-Camburg consists of the following municipalities:

References

Verwaltungsgemeinschaften in Thuringia